In mathematics, Fatou's lemma establishes an inequality relating the Lebesgue integral of the limit inferior of a sequence of functions to the limit inferior of integrals of these functions.  The lemma is named after Pierre Fatou.

Fatou's lemma can be used to prove the Fatou–Lebesgue theorem and Lebesgue's dominated convergence theorem.

Standard statement

Fatou's lemma remains true if its assumptions hold -almost everywhere.

Proof
Fatou's lemma does not require the monotone convergence theorem, but the latter can be used to provide a quick proof.  A proof directly from the definitions of integrals is given further below.  

These satisfy:
 the sequence  is pointwise non-decreasing at any  and
 , .
Since , we immediately see that  is measurable.

Via the Monotone Convergence Theorem 
Moreover, 
  
By the Monotone Convergence Theorem and property (1), the limit and integral may be interchanged:

where the last step used property (2).

From "first principles" 
To demonstrate that the monotone convergence theorem is not "hidden", the proof below does not use any properties of Lebesgue integral except those established here.

Now we turn to the main theorem

The proof is complete.

Examples for strict inequality
Equip the space  with the Borel σ-algebra and the Lebesgue measure.
 Example for a probability space: Let  denote the unit interval. For every natural number  define

 Example with uniform convergence: Let  denote the set of all real numbers. Define 

These sequences  converge on  pointwise (respectively uniformly) to the zero function (with zero integral), but every  has integral one.

The role of non-negativity
A suitable assumption concerning the negative parts of the sequence f1, f2, . . . of functions is necessary for Fatou's lemma, as the following example shows. Let S denote the half line [0,∞) with the Borel σ-algebra and the Lebesgue measure. For every natural number n define

This sequence converges uniformly on S to the zero function and the limit, 0, is reached in a finite number of steps: for every x ≥ 0, if , then fn(x) = 0.  However, every function fn has integral −1.  Contrary to Fatou's lemma, this value is strictly less than the integral of the limit (0).  

Reverse Fatou lemma
Let f1, f2, . . . be a sequence of extended real-valued measurable functions defined on a measure space (S,Σ,μ). If there exists a non-negative integrable function g on S such that fn ≤ g for all n, then

Note: Here g integrable means that g is measurable and that .

Sketch of proof
We apply linearity of Lebesgue integral and Fatou's lemma to the sequence   Since  this sequence is defined -almost everywhere and non-negative.

Extensions and variations of Fatou's lemma

Integrable lower bound
Let f1, f2, . . . be a sequence of extended real-valued measurable functions defined on a measure space (S,Σ,μ). If there exists an integrable function g on S such that fn ≥ −g for all n, then

Proof
Apply Fatou's lemma to the non-negative sequence given by fn + g.

Pointwise convergence
If in the previous setting the sequence f1, f2, . . . converges pointwise to a function f μ-almost everywhere on S, then

Proof
Note that f has to agree with the limit inferior of the functions fn almost everywhere, and that the values of the integrand on a set of  measure zero have no influence on the value of the integral.

Convergence in measure
The last assertion also holds, if the sequence f1, f2, . . . converges in measure to a function f.

Proof
There exists a subsequence such that

Since this subsequence also converges in measure to f, there exists a further subsequence, which converges pointwise to f almost everywhere, hence the previous variation of Fatou's lemma is applicable to this subsubsequence.

Fatou's Lemma with Varying Measures
In all of the above statements of Fatou's Lemma, the integration was carried out with respect to a single fixed measure μ. Suppose that μn is a sequence of measures on the measurable space (S,Σ) such that (see Convergence of measures)

Then, with fn non-negative integrable functions and f being their pointwise limit inferior, we have

{| class="toccolours collapsible collapsed" width="90%" style="text-align:left"
!Proof
|-
|We will prove something a bit stronger here. Namely, we will allow fn to converge μ-almost everywhere on a subset E of S. We seek to show that

Let 
.
Then μ(E-K)=0 and 

Thus, replacing E by E-K we may assume that fn converge to f pointwise on E. Next, note that for any simple function φ we have

Hence, by the definition of the Lebesgue Integral, it is enough to show that if φ is any non-negative simple function less than or equal to f, then 

Let a be the minimum non-negative value of φ. Define

We first consider the case when . 
We must have that μ(A) is infinite since  

where M is the (necessarily finite) maximum value of that φ attains.

Next, we define

We have that

But An is a nested increasing sequence of functions and hence, by the continuity from below μ,
.
Thus, 
.
At the same time, 

proving the claim in this case.

The remaining case is when . We must have that μ(A) is finite. Denote, as above, by M the maximum value of φ and fix ε>0. Define

Then An is a nested increasing sequence of sets whose union contains A. Thus, A-An is a decreasing sequence of sets with empty intersection. Since A has finite measure (this is why we needed to consider the two separate cases),

Thus, there exists n such that 

Therefore, since

there exists N such that 

Hence, for 

At the same time, 

Hence, 

Combining these inequalities gives that

Hence, sending ε to 0 and taking the liminf in n, we get that

completing the proof.
|}

Fatou's lemma for conditional expectations
In probability theory, by a change of notation, the above versions of Fatou's lemma are applicable to sequences of random variables X1, X2, . . . defined on a probability space ; the integrals turn into expectations. In addition, there is also a version for conditional expectations.

Standard version
Let X1, X2, . . . be a sequence of non-negative random variables on a probability space  and let
 be a sub-σ-algebra. Then
   almost surely.

Note: Conditional expectation for non-negative random variables is always well defined, finite expectation is not needed.

Proof
Besides a change of notation, the proof is very similar to the one for the standard version of Fatou's lemma above, however the monotone convergence theorem for conditional expectations has to be applied.

Let X denote the limit inferior of the Xn. For every natural number k define pointwise the random variable

Then the sequence Y1,  Y2, . . . is increasing and converges pointwise to X.
For k ≤ n, we have Yk ≤ Xn, so that
   almost surely
by the monotonicity of conditional expectation, hence
   almost surely,
because the countable union of the exceptional sets of probability zero is again a null set.
Using the definition of X, its representation as pointwise limit of the Yk, the monotone convergence theorem for conditional expectations, the last inequality, and the definition of the limit inferior, it follows that almost surely

Extension to uniformly integrable negative parts
Let X1, X2, . . . be a sequence of random variables on a probability space  and let
 be a sub-σ-algebra. If the negative parts

are uniformly integrable with respect to the conditional expectation, in the sense that, for ε > 0 there exists a c > 0 such that

, 
then

   almost surely.

Note: On the set where

satisfies

the left-hand side of the inequality is considered to be plus infinity. The conditional expectation of the limit inferior might not be well defined on this set, because the conditional expectation of the negative part might also be plus infinity.

Proof
Let ε > 0. Due to uniform integrability with respect to the conditional expectation, there exists a c > 0 such that

Since

where x+ := max{x,0} denotes the positive part of a real x, monotonicity of conditional expectation (or the above convention) and the standard version of Fatou's lemma for conditional expectations imply

   almost surely.

Since

we have

   almost surely,

hence

   almost surely.

This implies the assertion.

References
 

 

Inequalities
Lemmas in analysis
Theorems in measure theory
Real analysis
Articles containing proofs